Richard Wallop (died c. 1435), of Nether Wallop, Hampshire, was an English politician.

He was a Member (MP) of the Parliament of England for Hampshire in December 1421.

References

Year of birth missing
1435 deaths
English MPs December 1421
People from Test Valley